Cathie Marsh (17 February 1951 - 1 January 1993) was a British sociologist and statistician.

Career 
She read Chinese and Social and Political Sciences at Cambridge University; worked at the SSRC Survey Unit (mid-1970s); was a lecturer at Cambridge University, and worked at the University of Manchester, where she was appointed Professor in 1992. She died of breast cancer in 1993, aged 41.

She wrote two important books: The Survey Method, which made a case for the use of surveys in sociology, and Exploring Data, which explained statistics in a manner in which social scientists students would enjoy. This book was updated by Jane Elliott (academic) in 2008.

The Cathie Marsh Institute for Social Research (CMIST) at the University of Manchester was named after her. The computing room in her old faculty at the University of Cambridge, SPS, Faculty of Human, Social, and Political Science, University of Cambridge, was renamed the Cathie Marsh Machine Room after her death.

References

British sociologists
British statisticians
British women sociologists
Women statisticians
1951 births
1993 deaths